Laurent Biancani (1933–2003) was a French photographer.

1933 births
2003 deaths
French photographers